Mark Donovan (born February 15, 1966) is the team president of the Kansas City Chiefs. Donovan was born in Pittsburgh, Pennsylvania, and graduated from Brown University in 1988, where he was a quarterback and team captain.  He completed 120 of 239 passes for 1777 yards in the 1986 season and 61 of 143 for 747 yards in the 1987 season.

He signed as a free agent with the New York Giants.
From 1997 to 1999 he was director of sales and marketing for the National Hockey League.

From 1999 to 2003 he was senior director marketing and sales for the National Football League.

From 2003 to 2009 he was senior vice president/operations for the Philadelphia Eagles where he focused on bringing events to Lincoln Financial Field.

Donovan joined the Chiefs in 2009, becoming chief operating officer. In January 2011, he became president of the Chiefs. In 2019, Donovan won his first Super Bowl when the Chiefs defeated the San Francisco 49ers 31-20 in Super Bowl LIV. In 2022, Donovan won his second Super Bowl when the Chiefs defeated the Philadelphia Eagles 38-35 in Super Bowl LVII.

References

External links 
 Kansas City Chiefs bio

Living people
1966 births
Sportspeople from Pittsburgh
Brown Bears football players
Kansas City Chiefs executives
Philadelphia Eagles executives
New York Giants players
Players of American football from Pittsburgh
American chief operating officers